University College of Engineering, Panruti is a college located in Panruti, Cuddalore district, Tamil Nadu, India. It was established in 2008 and is affiliated to Anna University. This college, during its inception was under the administrative control of Anna University Tiruchirappalli. Dr.V.Ramachandran was the Founder Vice Chancellor of this university and he spearheaded the process of starting 6 new engineering colleges each at Ariyalur, Pattukottai, Thirukkuvalai,  Panruti, Dindigul and Ramanathapuram. R.Sivaraman was the First Special Officer of this institution and V.Kumarasamy was the then Dean. All the initial infrastructures were created and subsequently the college was moved to Panikankuppam abutting Panruti. The college offers B.E. courses in various fields. As the Government of Tamil Nadu has adopted the online counselling for the Tamil Nadu Engineering Admissions (TNEA) from the year 2018 onwards for all 540 affiliated colleges, this institution acts as the TNEA facilitating centre for the Cuddalore District.

This institution also has close ties with the Neyveli Lignite Corporation by offering various BTech Part Time Programmes to its employees.

References

External links
 Institute official information

Engineering colleges in Tamil Nadu
Educational institutions established in 2008
Colleges affiliated to Anna University
2008 establishments in Tamil Nadu
Education in Cuddalore district